Luís Galego (born in Porto, Portugal, 25 April 1966) is a Portuguese chess grandmaster. He represented Portugal in ten Chess Olympiads (at top board since 2002), and achieved a top Elo rating of 2543, and was national champion five times, most recently in 2012.

In 2006, he tied for 2nd–9th with Luke McShane, Stephen J. Gordon, Gawain Jones, Šarūnas Šulskis, Danny Gormally, Klaus Bischoff and Karel van der Weide in the 2nd EU Individual Open Chess Championship in Liverpool.

As of March 2011, his rating is 2500, making him Portugal's top player.

References

External links
 
 

1966 births
Living people
Portuguese chess players
Chess grandmasters
Chess Olympiad competitors
Sportspeople from Porto